This is a list of Old Guildfordians, being notable former students of Guildford Grammar School, an Anglican Church school in Guildford, a suburb of Perth, Western Australia.

The source of most of the information below about each Old Guildfordian's years of attendance, and some of the information about their accomplishments, is the list of Accomplished Old Guildfordians, published by the Old Guildfordians Association Inc.

Vice Regal
Sir Francis Burt AC, KCMG, QC (1931–1935) – Governor of Western Australia
Sir Wallace Kyle GCB, KCVO, CBE, DSO, DFC (1922–1927) – Governor of Western Australia
David Malcolm AC, QC (1950–1955) – Lieutenant Governor of Western Australia

Academia and Science

Chancellors and Vice-Chancellors
Donald Aitken (1938–1941) – Chancellor, University of Western Australia

Others – Academia and Science
Ian Alexander (1954–1964) – Adjunct Professor, Curtin University
Michael Gannon (1983–1988) – obstetrician and gynaecologist; President of the Australian Medical Association 
Barry Ninham AO DSc FAA (1945–1952) – Founder and Head of the Department of Applied Mathematics, Australian National University

Business
John Roberts (1943–1947) – founding chairman and executive director of Multiplex

Law

Chief Justice
Sir Francis Burt AC, KCMG, QC (1931–1935) – Chief Justice of Western Australia
David Malcolm AC, QC (1950–1955) – Chief Justice of Western Australia
Edmund Drake-Brockman (1897–1902) – Chief Justice of the Commonwealth Court of Conciliation and Arbitration

Others – Law

John L. C. Wickham (1929–1936) – Justice of the Supreme Court of Western Australia
Karl Edgar Drake-Brockman (1899–1910) – Justice of the Supreme Court of Papua New Guinea

Media, Entertainment, Culture and the Arts
Piers Akerman (1965–1967) – journalist, editor (The Advertiser, Adelaide, The Sunday Herald Sun, Melbourne); columnist (The Daily Telegraph, Sydney) (also attended Christ Church Grammar School)
Keir Beck (1977–1987) – stuntman, film director
Frederick "Ben" Carlin (1926–1929) – adventurer (first and only person to circumnavigate the world in an amphibious vehicle)
Andrew Denton (1977) – television producer, comedian, television presenter and radio presenter
N'fa Forster-Jones – hip hop recording artist, best known as the frontman for 1200 Techniques (winner, ARIA Award)
Brendon Julian (1985–1987) – television sports presenter
Karl Langdon (1981–1985) – radio sports presenter
Heath Ledger (1987–1996) – actor (winner, Academy Award for Best Supporting Actor), director
Kenneth (Seaforth) Mackenzie (1927–1929) – poet, novelist
Jamie (Stormie) Mills (1979–1984) – street/visual artist
Paul Murray (1963–1967) – journalist, editor, columnist (The West Australian); radio presenter (6PR)
Julian (Randolph) Stow (1950–1952) – writer, novelist and poet
Carl Vine (1967–1971) – composer of contemporary classical music
Archie Weller (1968–1975) – writer of novels, short stories and screen plays

Military

Chiefs of Services
Sir Alwyn Ragnar Garrett, KBE, CB (1922–1927) – Chief of the General Staff, Australian Army
Sir Wallace Kyle GCB, KCVO, CBE, DSO, DFC (1922–1927) – Vice-Chief of the Air Staff, Royal Air Force

Others – Military
David Holthouse (1949) – Rear Admiral, Royal Australian Navy
Arnold Potts DSO, OBE, MC (1911–1914) – Brigadier, led 21st Brigade of the Second AIF during its defence of the Kokoda Trail during the Second World War

Politics and Public Service

Premiers
Kim Hames (1966–1970) – Deputy Premier, Minister in various portfolios, Barnett Ministry, Western Australia

Cabinet Ministers
John Day (1968–1972) – Minister in various portfolios, Barnett Ministry, Western Australia
Senator Tom Drake-Brockman – Minister in various portfolios, Second Gorton Ministry, McMahon Ministry and Fraser caretaker ministry, Australia
Sir Gordon Freeth KBE – Minister in various portfolios, Australia

Other Members of Parliament
Ian Alexander (1954–1964) – Member of the Legislative Assembly of Western Australia for the Electoral district of Perth
Richard Burt (1924–1927) – Member of the Legislative Assembly of Western Australia for the Electoral district of Murchison-Eyre
Senator Arthur (Winston) Crane (1954–1957) – Senator for Western Australia
Ken Dunn – Member of the Legislative Assembly of Western Australia for the Electoral district of Darling Range
Mervyn Forrest – Member of the Legislative Council of Western Australia for the North Province (also attended Hale School)
John Hallett – Member of the Australian House of Representatives for the Division of Canning
Vernon Hamersley – Member of the Legislative Council of Western Australia for the Central Province
John Hearman – Member of the Legislative Assembly of Western Australia for the Electoral district of Blackwood, Speaker of the Legislative Assembly
Guy Henn (1921) – Member of the Legislative Assembly of Western Australia for the Electoral district of Leederville and the Electoral district of Wembley (also attended Lancing College, Surrey)
Tom Herzfeld – Member of the Legislative Assembly of Western Australia for the Electoral district of Mundaring
Senator Peter Whish-Wilson (1983–1985) – Senator for Tasmania

Others – Politics and Public Service
Tudor Harvey Barnett AO (1938–1942) – Director-General of Security, the head of the Australian Security Intelligence Organisation (ASIO), 1981–1985
Sir Gordon Freeth KBE – Ambassador to Japan, High Commissioner to the United Kingdom

Sport

Athletics
John Mackenzie (1978–1982) – competed in Commonwealth Games (Victoria, British Columbia, 1994)

Australian rules football
Corey Adamson (2005–2009) – AFL player (West Coast Eagles)
Matt Clape (1985–1986) – AFL player (Carlton, West Coast Eagles)
James Davies (1940–1944) – WANFL and VFL player (Swan Districts, Carlton, Claremont) (Sandover Medallist, 1944)
David Ellard (2005–2006) – AFL player (Carlton)
Zac Fisher (2011–2015) – AFL Player (Carlton Football Club)
Cruize Garlett (2005–2006) – AFL player (North Melbourne)
Dalton Gooding (1968–1972) – WANFL player (Claremont), Chairman, West Coast Eagles
Paul Gow – AFL player (Footscray) 
Larry Kickett (1970–1972) – WANFL player (East Perth) (member, East Perth premiership team, 1978)
Karl Langdon (1981–1985) – AFL player (West Coast Eagles) (member, West Coast Eagles premiership team, 1992)
Griffin Logue (2010–2015) AFL Player (Fremantle Football Club)
John McGuire (1970–1972) – WANFL player (East Perth) (member, East Perth premiership team, 1978)
Luke Miles (1999–2003) – AFL player (St Kilda)
Gerald Mitchell (1945–1951) – WANFL player (East Fremantle)
Clancee Pearce (2006–2007) – AFL player (Fremantle) (also attended Chisholm Catholic College)
Alexander Rance (2005–2006) – AFL player (Richmond)
Sam Taylor (2012–2016) AFL Player (Greater Western Sydney Giants)
Gerald Ugle (2007–2010) AFL Player (Greater Western Sydney Giants)
Jordan Clark (2017-2018) AFL Player (Geelong Football Club)

Baseball
Corey Adamson (2005–2009) – international player (Australia, San Diego Padres)

Cricket
Kade Harvey (1985–1992) – state player (Western Australia)
Brendon Julian (1985–1987) – national player (Australia)
John McGuire (1970–1972) – captain of Aboriginal team that toured UK, 1988
Michael Constantine (1966–1970) – state player (Western Australia)
David Moody (2008–2012) – state player (Western Australia)
Tom Moody (1979–1983) – national player (Australia) and international coach (Sri Lanka, Sunrisers Hyderabad)
Stewart Walters (1996–2000) – county player (Surrey, Glamorgan)

Olympics
Graham Gipson (1945–1950) – athletics, Melbourne 1956 (silver medallist)
Geoffrey Hale (1951–1953) – rowing (men's eight), Rome 1960
Robin Jeffery (2000–2004) – slalom canoeing (C-2 event), London 2012
Roger Ninham (1950–1955) – rowing (men's eight), Rome 1960; rowing (men's coxless pair), Tokyo 1964
Kevin O'Halloran (1951–1955) – swimming, Melbourne 1956 (gold medallist)
Ronald Snook (1985–1989) – rowing (quadruple sculls), Atlanta 1996
Shane Tonkin (1986–1988) – baseball, Atlanta 1996

Rowing
Sir Gordon Freeth KBE – competed in Empire Games (coxed fours), Sydney, 1938 (gold medallist)

See also

 List of schools in Western Australia
 List of boarding schools
 Public Schools Association

References

External links
Guildford Grammar School website
Old Guildfordians Association

Lists of people educated in Western Australia by school affiliation